Nigilgia browni is a moth in the family Brachodidae. It was described by Kallies in 2013. It is found on Christmas Island.

References

Natural History Museum Lepidoptera generic names catalog

Brachodidae
Moths described in 2013